Pucachuaña (possibly from Aymara puka colored, ch'uwaña oozing of water and other liquids; melting of metals and other things) is a mountain in the Vilcanota mountain range in the Andes of Peru, about  high. It is situated in the Puno Region, Melgar Province, Nuñoa District. It lies west of Yuracjasa.

References

Mountains of Peru
Mountains of Puno Region